José Mendes may refer to:
 José Mendes (footballer) (born 1947), Portuguese footballer
 José Mendes (physicist) (born 1962), Portuguese physicist
 José Mendes (athlete) (born 1972), Portuguese sprinter
 José Mendes (cyclist) (born 1985), Portuguese cyclist